Dijkgraaf (Dutch - dyke count) may refer to:

People
Elbert Dijkgraaf (born 1970), Dutch economist and politician
Robbert Dijkgraaf (born 1960), Dutch mathematical physicist and string theorist

Other uses
Dijkgraaf (official), the head of a Dutch water board
Dijkgraaf, Gelderland, a waterway in Gelderland, Netherlands
Dijkgraafplein, a square in Amsterdam-Osdorp, Netherlands